John Austen (died 1572) was an English politician.

Family
Austen married Joan Snelling and they had at least two sons including the MP, George Austen.

Career
He was a Member (MP) of the Parliament of England for Guildford in 1563. He was Mayor of Guildford in 1566.

References

Year of birth missing
1572 deaths
People from Guildford
English MPs 1563–1567